The following is a list of events affecting Mexican television in 2019. Events listed include television show debuts, finales, and cancellations; channel launches, closures, and re-brandings; stations changing or adding their network affiliations; and information about controversies and carriage disputes.

Events

Television shows

Debuts
Soltereo con hijas (2019–present)

Programs on-air

1970s
Plaza Sesamo (1972–present)

1990s
Acapulco Bay (1995–present) 
Corazon salvaje (1993–present) 
Esmeralda (1997–present)

2000s
Alma de hierro (2008–present) 
Big Brother México (2002-2005, 2015–present)
Hotel Erotica Cabo (2006–present) 
Lo Que Callamos Las Mujeres (2001–present)

2010s
40 y 20 (2016–present) 
Atrapada (2018–present) 
 Casa de las Flores (2018–present)
Como dice el dicho (2011–present) 
El Chiapo (2017–present) 
La Voz… México (2011–present) 
Por amar sin ley (2018-2019) 
México Tiene Talento (2014–present) 
Rubirosa (2018–present) 
Sin tu mirads (2017–present) 
Valiant Love (2012–present)

Ending this year

LOL: Last One Laughing (2018-2019) 
5 July - Por amar sin ley (2018-2019)

Television stations

Station launches

Network affiliation changes

Deaths

See also
List of Mexican films of 2019
2019 in Mexico

References